Torkel Ravndal (October 14, 1936 – September 14, 2004) was a weightlifter and powerlifter from Sandnes, Norway. He also toured with his strong man-show.

While entertaining with his show, a woman was involved in a car accident nearby, and Ravndal lifted the car off her (enough for other helpers to pull her away).  In the process he suffered injuries to his hands as a result of the car's metal bumper cutting into them.

A song about him was made by the nationally known pop band DeLillos.

External links
 Official web site

1936 births
2004 deaths
Norwegian male weightlifters
Norwegian powerlifters
20th-century Norwegian people